Why Trust Your Husband? is a 1921 American silent comedy film directed by George Marshall and starring Eileen Percy, Harry Myers and Harry Dunkinson.

Cast
 Eileen Percy as Eunice Day
 Harry Myers as	Elmer Day
 Ray Ripley as 	Joe Perry
 Harry Dunkinson as 	Uncle Horace
 Milla Davenport as 	Aunt Miranda
 Jane Miller as Maud Stone
 Hayward Mack as 	Gilbert Stone
 Bess True as 	Marie

References

Bibliography
 Connelly, Robert B. The Silents: Silent Feature Films, 1910-36, Volume 40, Issue 2. December Press, 1998.
 Munden, Kenneth White. The American Film Institute Catalog of Motion Pictures Produced in the United States, Part 1. University of California Press, 1997.
 Solomon, Aubrey. The Fox Film Corporation, 1915-1935: A History and Filmography. McFarland, 2011.

External links
 

1921 films
1921 comedy films
1920s English-language films
American silent feature films
Silent American comedy films
American black-and-white films
Fox Film films
Films directed by George Marshall
1920s American films